Senghor is a Serer surname - an ethnic group found in Senegal, Gambia and Mauritania. Personalities with this surname include:

 André Senghor (born 1986), Senegalese footballer
 Augustin Diamacoune Senghor (1928–2007), Senegalese Catholic priest and Casamance separatist
 Augustin Senghor, Senegalese politician
 Constance Senghor (born 1963), Senegalese athlete
 Fatou Jagne Senghore, Gambian-Senegalese activist and lawyer
 Fatou Kandé Senghor (born 1971), Senegalese film director, writer, and photographer
 Lamine Senghor (1889–1927), Senegalese political activist
 Léopold Sédar Senghor (1906–2001), Senegalese poet, politician and cultural theorist
 Louis Jacques Senghor (born 1952), Senegalese politician
 Robert Coleman-Senghor (1940–2011), American professor and politician
 Shaka Senghor, American college lecturer and author